Phrynichus is a genus of tailless whipscorpions in the family Phrynichidae. There are about 16 described species in Phrynichus.

Species
These 17 species belong to the genus Phrynichus:

 Phrynichus brevispinatus Weygoldt, 1998 i c g
 Phrynichus ceylonicus (C. L. Koch, 1843) i c g
 Phrynichus deflersi Simon, 1887 i c g
 Phrynichus dhofarensis Weygoldt, Pohl and Polak, 2002 i c g
 Phrynichus exophthalmus Whittick, 1940 i c g
 Phrynichus gaucheri Weygoldt, 1998 i c g
 Phrynichus heurtaultae Weygoldt, Pohl and Polak, 2002 i c g
 Phrynichus jayakari Pocock, 1894 i c g
 Phrynichus longespina (Simon, 1936) i c g
 Phrynichus madagascariensis Weygoldt, 1998 i c g
 Phrynichus nigrimanus (C. L. Koch, 1847) i c g
 Phrynichus orientalis Weygoldt, 1998 i c g
 Phrynichus phipsoni Pocock, 1894 i c g
 Phrynichus pusillus Pocock, 1894 i c g
 Phrynichus scaber (Gervais, 1844) i c g
 Phrynichus spinitarsus Karsch, 1879 i c g
 Phrynichus persicus, Miranda and Zamani, 2018)

Data sources: i = ITIS, c = Catalogue of Life, g = GBIF, b = Bugguide.net

References

Further reading

 
 
 
 
 
 

Amblypygi